Abhinav Manota (born 7 April 1992) is an Indian-born New Zealand badminton player. He won four Oceania Championships title, two in the men's singles, and two in the men's doubles.

Personal life 
Manota is an Indian immigrant who came to New Zealand in 2014, to study Diploma in Business and Enterprise Management from Abacus Institute of Studies. He settled in Christchurch and representing Canterbury in the New Zealand national events.

Achievements

Oceania Championships 
Men's singles

Men's doubles

BWF International Challenge/Series (6 runners-up) 
Men's singles

Men's doubles

Mixed doubles

  BWF International Challenge tournament
  BWF International Series tournament
  BWF Future Series tournament

References

External links 
 

1992 births
Living people
Sportspeople from Jalandhar
Indian male badminton players
Indian emigrants to New Zealand
Sportspeople from Christchurch
New Zealand sportspeople of Indian descent
New Zealand male badminton players